Dennison Airport was an airfield operational in the mid-20th century in Quincy, Massachusetts, United States.

History
In 1927, a small civilian airfield was established at Squantum near the intersection of East Squantum Street and Quincy Shore Drive.  Amelia Earhart, when she lived in Medford, Massachusetts, was a share-holding director and helped finance the construction of the airport. She also flew on the first official flight out of the airport on September 3, 1927.   On September 28, 1927, Thea Rasche, a famous German aviatrix, crashed at Dennison Airport while attempting to land her Flamingo biplane   The plane was damaged, but Rasche was uninjured. Dennison Airport closed down in 1942 and its land was taken over by the Navy for the expansion of the Naval Air Station Squantum.

See also
Naval Air Station Squantum

References

Defunct airports in Massachusetts
Airports in Norfolk County, Massachusetts
Buildings and structures in Quincy, Massachusetts